Maha Manishi is a 1985 Indian Telugu-language action drama film co-written and directed by M. Balaiah starring Krishna, Jaya Prada, Radha and Jaggayya. The film has musical score by J. V. Raghavulu.

Cast 
 Krishna as SambhuPrasad & Raja
 Jaya Prada
 Radha
 Jaggayya
 Prabhakara Reddy
 Giribabu 
 Sudhakar
 Suttivelu
 Prasad Babu

Music 
The soundtrack album scored and composed by J. V. Raghavulu comprised 6 tracks.
 "Chitteluka Chitteluka" — Madhavapeddi Ramesh, P. Susheela
 "Choopulu Choopulu" — K. J. Yesudas, P. Susheela
 "Dee Dee Dee" — P. Susheela, Madhavapeddi Ramesh
 "Evarunenu Evarunenu" — K. J. Yesudas, P. Susheela
 "Gumma Gumma" — S. Janaki
 "Muddo Voo Vaddu" — Raj Sitaraman, S. Janaki

References

External links 

Maha Manishi on Gaana

Indian action films
Films scored by J. V. Raghavulu
1985 films
1980s Telugu-language films
1985 action films